James Duckworth was the defending champion but lost in the first round to Lukáš Rosol.

Radu Albot won the title after defeating Rosol 6–2, 6–0 in the final.

Seeds

Draw

Finals

Top half

Bottom half

References

External links
Main draw
Qualifying draw

Istanbul Challenger - 1
2022 Singles